Wargentin is an unusual lunar impact crater which has been filled to its  rim by a basaltic lava flow, forming a raised plateau. When the lava flow occurred, it erupted from within the crater walls and proceeded to accumulate until overrunning the lowest portion of the rim. Some blockage then prevented the lava flow from returning to equilibrium. Since the time when this occurred, some ejecta has been deposited across the top, giving the surface a higher albedo than is typical for deposits of basalt.

The rim of Wargentin is somewhat worn and is overlain by a few small craters. The outer wall climbs to a height of 0.3 km above the surrounding terrain. A spoked pattern of wrinkle ridges can be discerned on the surface, radiating from the center of the crater.

Wargentin is located on the approaches to the southwest lunar limb, so that it appears elongated when viewed from the Earth. It is connected along the southeast rim to the slightly smaller crater Nasmyth, which is in turn overlaid by the larger Phocylides.  To the northeast is the much larger walled plain Schickard.

The crater is named after eighteenth century Swedish astronomer Peter Wargentin, who observed the brightest maximum ever recorded of the famous variable star Mira.

Satellite craters
By convention these features are identified on lunar maps by placing the letter on the side of the crater midpoint that is closest to Wargentin.

References

External links
 

Impact craters on the Moon